Ammonium ferric citrate (also known as ferric ammonium citrate or ammoniacal ferrous citrate) has the formula (NH4)5[Fe(C6H4O7)2]. A distinguishing feature of this compound is that it is very soluble in water, in contrast to ferric citrate which is not very soluble.

In its crystal structure each moiety of citric acid has lost four protons. The deprotonated hydroxyl group and two of the carboxylate groups ligate to the ferric center, while the third carboxylate group coordinates with the ammonium.

Uses
Ammonium ferric citrate has a range of uses, including:

 As a food ingredient, it has an INS number 381, and is used as an acidity regulator. Most notably used in the Scottish beverage Irn-Bru.
 Water purification
 As a reducing agent of metal salts of low activity like gold and silver
 With potassium ferricyanide as part of the cyanotype photographic process
 Used in Kligler's Iron Agar (KIA) test to identify enterobacteriaceae bacteria by observing their metabolism of different sugars,  producing hydrogen sulfide 
 In medical imaging, ammonium ferric citrate is used as a contrast medium.  
 As a hematinic

See also 
 Food additive
 List of food additives

References 

Ammonium compounds
Citrates
Iron(III) compounds
MRI contrast agents
Photographic chemicals
Double salts